Brian Marwood (born 5 February 1960) is an English former footballer who made more than 400 appearances in the Football League and was capped once for England. He is City Football Group’s Managing Director of Global Football.

Club career

Hull City
Born 5 February 1960 in Seaham, County Durham, Marwood started his career at Hull City, joining in 1976 as an apprentice and making his way up through the youth and reserve ranks. A pacy and tricky winger, he made his debut aged 19 in a Third Division match against Mansfield Town on 12 January 1980. He spent five seasons with the Tigers, during which time they were relegated to the Fourth Division and then promoted back to the third. After 1983–84, in which Hull City reached the Associate Members' Cup Final and narrowly missed out on promotion to the Second Division, Marwood attracted the interest of Sheffield Wednesday. In all he played 191 times for Hull and scored 53 goals.

Sheffield Wednesday
In June 1984 Marwood was signed by Sheffield Wednesday for £115,000.

The newly promoted Owls had a strong return to the top-flight under the guiding hand of manager Howard Wilkinson. In four seasons Marwood was a first team fixture. In 1985–86 the Owls finished 5th in the First Division and reached the FA Cup semi-finals. Marwood was joint top goalscorer in the League with centre forward Lee Chapman. Despite Wednesday's form tailing off after that, Marwood still shone in the side and after 128 appearances and 27 goals, he moved on.

Arsenal
Marwood was signed by Arsenal for £600,000 in March 1988, as manager George Graham was searching for a more dependable alternative to the erratic and injury prone Martin Hayes. He made his Arsenal debut against Oxford United on 30 March 1988. His first goal for the Gunners was a penalty in a 1–1 draw against Coventry City at Highbury 2 May 1988.

Marwood's impact at Arsenal was nearly immediate; his crosses supplied striker Alan Smith with goals throughout the 1988–89 season, in which Arsenal won the First Division title for the first time since 1971. Smith himself credits Marwood as being the most prolific supplier of assists while he was at Arsenal. He scored in each of Arsenals first four games in the winning season. He was also a reliable penalty taker and very accurate from corners and other dead ball situations. During this time, Marwood firmly established himself as the club's first choice left winger. Injury forced Marwood to miss the last five matches of the season, which included Arsenal's title-winning match against Liverpool at Anfield. Nevertheless, he still took away a league winners medal with 31 appearances that season. However, with the ban on English clubs in Europe still in place, Marwood was unable to play in the European Cup.

Injury restricted Marwood's chances in the 1989–90 season, and he only managed nineteen matches that season. After Arsenal signed Swedish international winger Anders Limpar in the summer of 1990, Marwood was no longer an automatic first choice, in all he played 60 matches for Arsenal, scoring 17 goals.

Sheffield United
He was sold to Sheffield United for £350,000 in September 1990.

In three seasons at United, Marwood only managed 22 appearances, and was loaned to Middlesbrough before making a permanent move to Swindon Town midway through 1992–93; Marwood played eleven times as Swindon won promotion to the Premier League, but was released by the club that summer.

Barnet
He finished his career at Barnet where he spent one season, playing 23 games as Barnet were relegated from Division Two.

International career
Marwood's performances for Arsenal earned him an England cap, in a friendly match against Saudi Arabia in Riyadh on 16 November 1988. As a 28-year-old he came on as a late substitution, replacing Michael Thomas, under manager Bobby Robson.

Professional Footballers' Association
Marwood was chairman of the Professional Footballers' Association between 1990 and 1993.

Career after retirement
Since retirement, Marwood has written his autobiography, The Life of Brian, and became a commentator on Radio 5 Live, Sky Sports and STAR Sports. He worked as UK sports marketing manager for Nike from 1997–2009.

Manchester City
He joined Manchester City with the title of football administrator in 2009, being an ex-colleague of former executive chairman, Garry Cook, at Nike.

Family
His son James was a former player at Newcastle United, St Mirren, Forest Green Rovers and Gateshead United. He currently coaches at Middlesbrough FC academy

Footnotes

References

1960 births
Arsenal F.C. players
Barnet F.C. players
England international footballers
English footballers
Association football wingers
Hull City A.F.C. players
Living people
Middlesbrough F.C. players
Sheffield United F.C. players
Sheffield Wednesday F.C. players
Swindon Town F.C. players
Sportspeople from Seaham
Footballers from County Durham
Manchester City F.C. directors and chairmen